The Western Eparchy is an eparchy of the Ukrainian Orthodox Church of Canada, which itself is under the Ecumenical Patriarchate.  The current bishop for the eparchy is Ilarion (Roman Rudnyk), and he is stylized as Bishop of Edmonton, and the Western Eparchy.  The last serving bishop for the diocese was Metropolitan John (Stinka), who went on to become the UOCC's Metropolitan, and Archbishop of Winnipeg.  John (Stinka) served in the capacity of "Bishop of Edmonton" for 20 years (1985–2005).  Ilarion was elected as Bishop of Edmonton at the Ukrainian Orthodox Church's Sobor (Church Council) on August 23, 2008, in Saskatoon, Saskatchewan.  This election was later ratified by the Ecumenical Patriarchate's Holy and Sacred Synod, and he was enthroned as Bishop of Edmonton on Sunday, October 26, 2008, at St. John's Cathedral by Metropolitan John.

The Western Eparchy consists of the Canadian provinces of Alberta and British Columbia, and has about 60 churches (most of them country churches), and two cathedral churches (St. John's Cathedral, Edmonton, and Holy Trinity Ukrainian Orthodox Cathedral).

List of bishops
 Andrew (Metiuk) (1958–1975)
 Boris (Yakovkevych) (1975–1983)
 John (Stinka) (1985–2005)
 Hilarion (Rudnyk) (2008–present)

See also
Ukrainian Orthodox Church of Canada
St. John's Cathedral, Edmonton
Holy Trinity Ukrainian Orthodox Cathedral (Vancouver)

External links
Ukrainian Orthodox Church of Canada
Western Eparchy official website

Ukrainian Orthodox Church of Canada
Edmonton and Western Canada
Ukrainian
Religious sees in Edmonton